Priestdaddy is a memoir by American poet Patricia Lockwood. It was named one of the 10 best books of 2017 by The New York Times and was awarded the 2018 Thurber Prize for American Humor. In 2019, the New York Times included the book on its list "The 50 Best Memoirs of the Past 50 Years," and The Guardian named it one of the 100 best books of the 21st century.

Development and publication history 
Lockwood began writing the book shortly after she and her husband, owing to financial difficulty and illness, moved back to live with her parents in her father's rectory. The 352-page memoir was published May 2, 2017 by the Riverhead imprint of Penguin Random House. In July 2017, Imagine Entertainment announced it had optioned Priestdaddy for development as a limited TV series.

Content and style
In Priestdaddy, Lockwood recounts her upbringing as the daughter of a married Lutheran minister who converted to Catholicism, becoming one of the few married Catholic priests. The book chronicles her return as an adult to live in her father's rectory and deals with issues of family, belief, belonging, and adulthood. Writing in The Chicago Tribune, Kathleen Rooney described Priestdaddy as "an unsparing yet ultimately affectionate portrait of faith and family." The Guardian called it a "dazzling comic memoir."

Reception
Priestdaddy was reviewed widely and favorably, with particular praise for Lockwood's wit and the "pleasure in her line-by-line writing; the author can describe even a seminarian’s ordination ceremony in a colorful, unexpected way, her prose dyed with bizarre sexuality, religious eroticism, and slapstick timing" (Laura Adamczyk writing at The A.V. Club). Rooney likewise said Lockwood's book displayed "the same offbeat intelligence, comic timing, gimlet skill for observation and verbal dexterity that she uses in both her poetry and her tweets." In The New York Times, Dwight Garner called Priestdaddy “electric,” "consistently alive with feeling,” and Lockwood's father Greg "one of the great characters of this nonfiction decade." Writing for Playboy, James Yeh dubbed it "a powerful true story from one of America’s most relevant and funniest writers," The New Yorker praised the book as "a vivid, unrelentingly funny memoir ... shot through with surprises and revelations," and The Atlantic lauded it as "a deliciously old-school, big-R Romantic endeavor."   Gemma Sieff, writing for The New York Times Book Review, concluded the memoir positioned Lockwood as "a formidably gifted writer who can do pretty much anything she pleases."

Awards

Priestdaddy was named one of the 10 best books of 2017 by The New York Times, one of the best books of the year by The Washington Post, The Boston Globe, The Chicago Tribune, The Sunday Times, The Guardian, The New Yorker, The Atlantic, New York, Elle, NPR, Amazon, and Publishers Weekly, among others, and was a finalist for the Kirkus Prize. Priestdaddy was awarded the 2018 Thurber Prize for American Humor.

References

American memoirs
Comedy books
Catholic priesthood
2017 non-fiction books
Riverhead Books books